Enste is a suburb of Meschede, in North Rhine-Westphalia.

Towns in North Rhine-Westphalia